This list is limited to bombings in Iraq and does not include other forms of attacks.

January 
 January 14 A bombing targeting Shiites in southern Iraq killed more than 50 people.
 January 27 A suicide bomber in Baghdad killed 33 people and wounded 65 others.

February 
 February 23 A series of bombings killed 32 people in Baghdad.

March 
 March 20 A series of explosions across Iraq killed 50 people and wounded 200 others.

April 
 April 19 A series of bombings across Iraq killed 36 people and wounded 150 others.

June 
 June 4 A suicide bomber killed 26 people and wounded 190 others in Baghdad.

July 
 July 23 A wave of terrorist incidents killed at least 90 people and wounded twice as more.

August 
 August 16 A series of bombings killed more than 90 people across Iraq.

September 
 September 30 A series of terrorist bombings killed 26 people and wounded 94 others.

See also 
 List of terrorist incidents in January–June 2012
 List of terrorist incidents in July–December 2012
 List of bombings during the Iraqi insurgency (2011–2013)
 Terrorist incidents in Iraq in 2013

References 

 
2012 in Iraq
Iraq
2012